The IHF Youth Beach Handball World Championship is an international beach handball competition contested by the men's and women's youth national teams of the member federations of International Handball Federation, the sport's global governing body.

The tournament was established in 2017, taking place every two year. The current tournament format lasts over approximately 6 days and involves 16 men's and 16 women's teams initially competing in four groups of four teams. Three teams from each group will advance to main round and then semifinals are played. The losing semi-finalists play each other in a play-off match to determine the third and fourth-placed teams.

The most recent edition was held in Flic-en-Flac (Mauritius) and crowned Spain and Hungary as champions in men's and women's category respectively beating Italy and Netherlands by 2–1.

Men

Summary

Men's medal table

Men's participating nations
;Legend
 – Champions
 – Runners-up
 – Third place
 — Withdrew from the World Championship
 — Hosts

Women

Summary

Women's medal table

Women's participating nations
;Legend
 – Champions
 – Runners-up
 – Third place
 — Withdrew from the World Championship
 — Hosts

See also
Beach handball at the World Games
Beach Handball World Championships
Asian Youth Beach Handball Championship
Oceania Youth Beach Handball Championship
Pan American Youth Beach Handball Championship

References

 
Beach handball competitions
Beach, Youth
World youth sports competitions
Recurring sporting events established in 2017
Beach Youth